"Tzini (Radio Mix)" is a single released by Greek singer Katy Garbi. The song was released to radios in July 2008, before its release as a digital download on August 11, 2008. It serves as Garbi's second track to be released as a digital download after her 2006 duet "Isovios Desmos" from the album Pos Allazei O Kairos, which was also the first Greek song to be released in such a way.
 The song is a dance remix of her Giannis Nikolaou written song "Tzini" from her 1990 album Gyalia Karfia. The song was remixed by fellow singers Giorgos Alkaios and Dionysis Schinas.

Personnel

Dionysis Skhinas – remixing
Giorgos Alkaios – remixing
Katerina Garbi – vocals

References

Katy Garbi songs
2008 songs
2008 singles
Greek-language songs